The 2020 EchoPark 250 was a NASCAR Xfinity Series race held on June 6, 2020 at Atlanta Motor Speedway in Hampton, Georgia. Contested over 163 laps on the  asphalt quad-oval intermediate speedway, it was the eighth race of the 2020 NASCAR Xfinity Series season and the season's first Dash 4 Cash race. Kaulig Racing part-time driver A. J. Allmendinger won his first ever race on a NASCAR oval.

The race was originally scheduled to be held on March 14, but was rescheduled due to the COVID-19 pandemic.

Report

Background 

Atlanta Motor Speedway (formerly Atlanta International Raceway) is a track in Hampton, Georgia, 20 miles (32 km) south of Atlanta. It is a 1.54-mile (2.48 km) quad-oval track with a seating capacity of 111,000. It opened in 1960 as a 1.5-mile (2.4 km) standard oval. In 1994, 46 condominiums were built over the northeastern side of the track. In 1997, to standardize the track with Speedway Motorsports' other two 1.5-mile (2.4 km) ovals, the entire track was almost completely rebuilt. The frontstretch and backstretch were swapped, and the configuration of the track was changed from oval to quad-oval. The project made the track one of the fastest on the NASCAR circuit.

The race was held without fans in attendance due to the ongoing COVID-19 pandemic.

Dash 4 Cash 
The Dash 4 Cash is a series of four races in the NASCAR Xfinity Series, preceded by a qualifying race. The top four points-eligible drivers in the previous race are eligible to win a $100,000 bonus on top of their race winnings if they win the race. Cup Series regulars are not permitted to compete in the races.

The EchoPark 250 was the season's first Dash 4 Cash race. Noah Gragson, Chase Briscoe, Brandon Jones, and rookie Harrison Burton were eligible to win after finishing in the top 4 at the Cheddar's 300 at Bristol.

Entry list 

 (R) denotes rookie driver.
 (i) denotes driver who is ineligible for series driver points.

Qualifying 
Noah Gragson was awarded the pole for the race as determined by a random draw.

Starting Lineup 

 . – Eligible for Dash 4 Cash prize money.
 The No. 44 of Tommy Joe Martins had to start from the rear due to unapproved adjustments.
 The No. 61 of Timmy Hill had to start from the rear on pace laps due to pitting before the green flag.

Race

Race results

Stage Results 
Stage One

Laps: 40

Stage Two

Laps: 40

Final Stage Results 

Laps: 83

 . – Won the Dash 4 Cash prize money and subsequently qualified for the Dash 4 Cash prize money in the next race.
 . – Qualified for Dash 4 Cash prize money in the next race.

Race statistics 

 Lead changes: 10 among 7 different drivers
 Cautions/Laps: 6 for 28
 Red flags: 0
 Time of race: 2 hours, 2 minutes, 37 seconds
 Average speed:

Media

Television 
The EchoPark 250 was carried by FS1 in the United States. Adam Alexander, Stewart-Haas Racing driver Clint Bowyer, and Jamie McMurray called the race from the Fox Sports Studio in Charlotte, with Jamie Little covering pit road.

Radio 
The Performance Racing Network (PRN) called the race for radio, which was simulcast on SiriusXM NASCAR Radio. Doug Rice and Mark Garrow anchored the action from the booth. Rob Albright called the race from turns 1 & 2 and Pat Patterson called the action through turns 3 & 4. Brad Gillie, Brett McMillan, and Doug Turnbull provided reports from pit road.

Standings after the race 

 Drivers' Championship standings

 Note: Only the first 12 positions are included for the driver standings.
 . – Driver has clinched a position in the NASCAR playoffs.

References 

2020 NASCAR Xfinity Series
EchoPark 250
NASCAR races at Atlanta Motor Speedway
2020 in sports in Georgia (U.S. state)
EchoPark 250